Caitlynn French (born May 8, 1989) is an American voice actress known for her work on English adaptations of Japanese anime shows and films associated with Media Blasters and Sentai Filmworks. Some of her major voice roles include Shiro in No Game No Life, Tina Sprout in Black Bullet, Miyu Edelfelt in Fate/kaleid liner Prisma Illya, Hana Isuzu in Girls und Panzer, Naru Sekiya in Hanayamata, Ai Astin in Sunday Without God, Matsurika Shinoji in Maria Holic, Chiaki Kurihara from Bodacious Space Pirates, Mei Tachibana in Say "I love you", Kanna Makino in Tamako Market, and Leviathan in Leviathan The Last Defense.

Biography

French was raised in Derby, Kansas. Along with her younger sister Shaelynn, she was drawn into the performing arts. As a high school student at Derby High School, French performed in musicals and stage plays such as West Side Story, Seussical and The People Vs. Maxine Lowe. She later attended Southwestern College in Winfield, Kansas and earned a degree in Theater Performance there in 2011.

Filmography

Film

Television

Video games

References

External links
 
 

Year of birth uncertain
21st-century American actresses
Actresses from Kansas
Actresses from Austin, Texas
Actresses from Texas
American voice actresses
Living people
People from Fort Worth, Texas
People from Derby, Kansas
Southwestern College (Kansas) alumni
1989 births